Berezovka is a rural locality (a settlement) in Bezrukavsky Selsoviet, Rubtsovsky District, Altai Krai, Russia. The population was 452 as of 2013. There are 3 streets.

Geography 
Berezovka is located 17 km northeast of Rubtsovsk (the district's administrative centre) by road. Bezrukavka is the nearest rural locality.

References 

Rural localities in Rubtsovsky District